Skoby is a bimunicipal locality situated in Östhammar Municipality and Uppsala Municipality in Uppsala County, Sweden with 230 inhabitants in 2010.

References 

Populated places in Uppsala County
Populated places in Östhammar Municipality
Populated places in Uppsala Municipality